Dindica pallens is a moth of the family Geometridae first described by Hiroshi Inoue in 1990. It is found on the Philippines.

References

Moths described in 1990
Pseudoterpnini